Köstner:

  (1912–1982), German wrestler
 Eduardo Javier Rubio Köstner (born 1983, Chuquicamata), a Chile an international footballer
 Elmer Joseph Koestner (1885–1959), a Major League Baseball pitcher
  (1906–1982), Austrian bishop
 Lorenz-Günther Köstner (born 1952), a German footballer
  (born 1975), German table tennis player

Koestner

 Katie Koestner, American activist against sexual assault

See also 
 Kostner
 Kestner

German-language surnames